Arnell is both a surname and a given name. Notable people with the name include:

People with the surname
Alan Arnell (1933–2013), English-born former footballer
Alma Arnell (1857–1934), Swedish painter
Amy Arnell, American singer
Ginny Arnell (born 1942), American pop & country music singer and songwriter
Guillaume Arnell (born 1962), member of the Senate of France
Hampus Wilhelm Arnell (1848–1932), Swedish bryologist
Helena Arnell (1697–1751), one of the first Finnish painters in Finland
Jonas Arnell (born 1969), Swedish Senior Systems Manager and expert on phaleristics
Kate Arnell (born 1983), British television presenter
Lauren Arnell (born 1987), Australian rules footballer
Lawrence Arnell, rapper and singer from Philadelphia, Pennsylvania
Richard Arnell (1917–2009), English composer of classical music
Samuel Mayes Arnell (1833–1903), American politician
Sigfrid Vilhelm Arnell (1895–1970), Swedish medical practitioner and hepaticologist
Vaughan Arnell, British music videos and television commercials director

People with the given name
Arnell Engstrom (1897–1970), American businessman and politician
Arnell Horton (1892–1987), Australian cricketer
Arnell Ignacio, Filipino game show host, comedian and actor

See also
Collection d'Arnell Andréa, French darkwave band founded by Jean-Christophe d'Arnell, Pascal Andréa, and Chloé St Liphard in 1986
Arenella
Arndell (disambiguation)
Arniella